Stomopteryx lineolella is a moth of the family Gelechiidae. It was described by Eduard Friedrich Eversmann in 1844. It is found in eastern and southern European Russia.

References

Moths described in 1844
Stomopteryx